Louis van der Westhuizen (born 31 March 1988) is a Namibian cricketer. He is a left-handed batsman and a slow left-arm bowler. He has played first-class cricket for the senior Namibian cricket team since 2006, having previously lined up for the Under-19s. He made his first-class cricket debut on 11 May 2006, for Namibia against Scotland in the 2006–07 ICC Intercontinental Cup.

Van der Westhuizen played for the Namibians in the Under-19s World Cup in 2006. Generally speaking, van der Westhuizen occupies the position of opening batsman for the Namibian side in limited-overs cricket. He was also part of the Namibian Under-19 team which won the Under-19 African Championship in 2007.

Van der Westhuizen has success as a batsman in the Twenty20 format of the game. Playing against Kenya in a Twenty20 match, he scored 145 runs from 50 balls, then the third-highest individual score of all time in top level Twenty20. He also scored an innings of 159*, with 16 sixes, against Kenya in Kampala during the 2011 ICC World Cricket League Africa Region Twenty20 Division One tournament (which is not considered a top-level Twenty20 tournament).

In January 2018, he was named in Namibia's squad for the 2018 ICC World Cricket League Division Two tournament.

References

External links

1988 births
White Namibian people
Namibian Afrikaner people
Namibian cricketers
Living people
Cricketers from Windhoek
Namibian people of Dutch descent